Peter Kyle McCarter Jr. (born 1945) is an Old Testament scholar. He is William Foxwell Albright Professor Emeritus in Biblical and Ancient Near Eastern Studies at Johns Hopkins University. McCarter is best known for his work on the Books of Samuel: he wrote volumes on I and II Samuel for the Anchor Bible Series.

References

1945 births
Living people
Old Testament scholars
Bible commentators
Johns Hopkins University faculty